is the traditional name of the month of July in the Japanese calendar. It can also refer to:
, Japanese manga artist
,  Mutsuki-class destroyer of the Imperial Japanese Navy

Japanese-language surnames